Seneca Caverns is a karst show cave in Germany Valley near Riverton, West Virginia, USA. It has been commercially used since 1930. The largest room inside the cave is the Teter Hall, which is 60 feet tall by 60 feet wide in some areas.

History
A German-American settler named Phillip Teter purchased the land surrounding Seneca Caverns in the 1770s. He may have first entered the cave on a quest for water to supply his livestock. The first recorded entry into the cave was in 1781 by Francis Asbury. The Teter family maintained ownership until 1928, at which point it became property of the Harman family, who began the process of commercializing the cave. In 1930 the new owners opened it to the public as a show cave. The property was acquired in 1984 by Greer Limestone.

Gallery

See also
Smoke Hole Caverns
Seneca Caverns (Ohio)

References

External links
Official site
Seneca Caverns on showcaves.com

Caves of West Virginia
Tourist attractions in Pendleton County, West Virginia
Show caves in the United States
Landforms of Pendleton County, West Virginia